Pachylebiodes vadoni is a species of beetle in the family Carabidae, the only species in the genus Pachylebiodes.

References

Lebiinae